Carey Ernest Henley (September 24, 1936 – April 15, 2013) was an American football player and coach.

Henley was born on September 24, 1936, in West Point, Mississippi, where he graduated from West Point High School in 1955. He served two years in the United States Marine Corps, where he played football for Camp LeJeune. He attended the University of Tennessee at Chattanooga, where he was captain of the 1961 Chattanooga Moccasins football team. In 1962, he played in one game in the American Football League (AFL) for the Buffalo Bills on September 30 against the Dallas Texans. Henley died on April 15, 2013.

Henley earned a master's degree from Middle Tennessee State University. He worked for the public schools of Chattanooga, Tennessee for 30 years, coaching and teaching at Kirkman Technical High School, Brainerd High School and Tyner High School.

References

External links
 

1936 births
2013 deaths
American football halfbacks
Buffalo Bills players
Chattanooga Mocs football players
High school football coaches in Tennessee
Middle Tennessee State University alumni
United States Marines
People from West Point, Mississippi
Coaches of American football from Mississippi
Players of American football from Mississippi